Donny Budiarto Utomo (born March 13, 1979) is an Indonesian swimmer, who specialized in butterfly events. He is a former multiple-time national record holder for the men's butterfly, and a six-time medalist at the Southeast Asian Games. He is also a two-time defending champion for the 200 m butterfly, before losing out to Malaysia's Daniel Bego at the 2007 Southeast Asian Games in Bangkok, Thailand.

Utomo made his first Indonesian team at the 2004 Summer Olympics in Athens, where he competed in the men's 200 m butterfly. Swimming in heat one, he edged out Honduras' Roy Barahona to take a second spot and thirty-third overall by 0.28 of a second in 2:05.71.

At the 2008 Summer Olympics in Beijing, Utomo qualified again for the 200 m butterfly. After winning a silver medal from SEA Games in Bangkok, Thailand, his entry time of 2:00.81 was officially accredited under a FINA B-standard. He challenged seven other swimmers in heat two, including his former rival James Walsh of the Philippines, and four-time Olympian Vladan Marković of the newly independent nation Serbia. He rounded out the field to last place by 0.32 of a second behind Markovic with a slowest time of 2:03.44. Utomo failed to advance into the semifinals, as he placed forty-fourth overall in the preliminaries.

References

External links
NBC Olympics Profile

1979 births
Living people
Indonesian people of Chinese descent
Indonesian male swimmers
Olympic swimmers of Indonesia
Swimmers at the 2004 Summer Olympics
Swimmers at the 2008 Summer Olympics
Male butterfly swimmers
Southeast Asian Games medalists in swimming
Southeast Asian Games gold medalists for Indonesia
Southeast Asian Games silver medalists for Indonesia
Competitors at the 2003 Southeast Asian Games
Competitors at the 2005 Southeast Asian Games
Competitors at the 2007 Southeast Asian Games
Competitors at the 2009 Southeast Asian Games